Pittsboro Masonic Lodge, also known as Columbus Lodge No. 102, is a historic Masonic Lodge located at Pittsboro, Chatham County, North Carolina.  It was built in 1838, and is a two-story, Greek Revival style frame building.  In 1846, it was enlarged by the addition of the distinctive pedimented second-story overhang carried on heavy square pillars.  It is one of the oldest still-functioning Masonic halls in North Carolina.

It was listed on the National Register of Historic Places in 1978.

References

External links
Pittsboro Masonic Lodge website

Masonic buildings in North Carolina
Clubhouses on the National Register of Historic Places in North Carolina
Greek Revival architecture in North Carolina
Buildings and structures completed in 1838
Buildings and structures in Chatham County, North Carolina
National Register of Historic Places in Chatham County, North Carolina
Pittsboro, North Carolina